The Kennemer Zweefvlieg Club (KZC) is the only Dutch Gliding club situated in the urban periphery called Randstad. The club was established in 1945 and has the Langeveld as homefield. Langeveld is situated between the dunes of the Dutch west coast in between Zandvoort and Noordwijk. The club flies from March till November in the weekends and on Wednesdays. On Wednesday evenings the club is opened for passengers to experience gliding. The club has a former RAF MEL-winch with six cables.

Dune running 
The KZC is one of the few clubs in the Netherlands that is able to make use of Ridgelift. When a strong northwest wind blows, it is possible to fly alongside the dunes without sinking. The wind is pushed up by the dunes which counteracts the descent of the glider. Because the gliders on the ridge do not reach the required altitude to return to the field, they land on the beach. The gliders are derigged and then taken back to the Langeveld by trailer.

The fleet 
The KZC fleet consists of 8 gliders and gives members the possibility to train as pilots, to take passengers, fly cross country and to fly competitions.

The club has the following gliders:
 Schleicher ASK 21, a twin seater that is excellent for both training flights and passenger flights.
 Schleicher ASK 21B, a twin seater that is excellent for both training flights and passenger flights. It has some better flight characteristics then the original ASK 21.
 Schleicher ASK 23, a single seater that, because of its easy flight characteristics, is perfect for student pilots.
 Schleicher ASW 27B, a single seater that looks similar to the ASW 28, but has flaps.
 Rolladen-Schneider LS4, a single seater with great performance and with good flight characteristics, is perfect for both training and cross country flights.

Furthermore, the club possesses two self-built oldtimer gliders. They were assembled in the 1960s in the Fokker factory:
 Schleicher K 8, a single seater with easy flight characteristics that is used by apprentices to practice.
 Schleicher K 6, a singleseater with an eye-catching green fuselage. This glider received the 'most beautiful K6' award in 2014 by the Dutch association for historic gliders ..

References

External links 
 

1945 establishments in the Netherlands
Gliding associations